Raúl Fernández Pavón (born 8 March 1978 in Brenes) is a former Spanish athlete specializing in the long jump. His biggest success is winning the gold medal during the 2002 European Indoor Championships in Vienna.

Competition record

Personal bests
Long jump (outdoor) - 8.26 m (Monachil, 2002)
Long jump (indoor) - 8.22 m (Vienna, 2002)

References

1978 births
Living people
Spanish male long jumpers
People from Vega del Guadalquivir
Sportspeople from the Province of Seville
Athletes (track and field) at the 2001 Mediterranean Games
Mediterranean Games competitors for Spain